Sonita was the country of Asura king Bana or Vana. His daughter Usha married Vasudeva Krishna's grandson Aniruddha.

References in Mahabharata
The link between Sonita kingdom and its king Bana is made clearer in the Bhagavata Purana

King Bana of Sonita is mentioned as follows:- Vasudeva Krishna hath slain Jarasandha, and Vakra, and Shishupala of mighty energy, and Bana in battle, and numerous other kings also have been slain by him (5:130). At (5:64) Krishna is again mentioned as the slayer of Vana and Bhumi's son Naraka (of Pragjyotisha Kingdom). At (9:46) Bana is mentioned as the son of Bali. (Diti (Matriarch) > Hiranyakasipu > Prahlada > Virochana > Bali > Bana (1:65).

See also 
 Kingdoms of Ancient India

References 
Mahabharata of Krishna Dwaipayana Vyasa, translated to English by Kisari Mohan Ganguli
Bhagavata purana of Krishna Dwaipayana Vyasa

Kingdoms in the Mahabharata